Graham Mann (26 June 1924 – 1 April 2000) was a British competitive sailor and Olympic medalist. He won a bronze medal in the Dragon class at the 1956 Summer Olympics in Melbourne, together with Ronald Backus and Jonathan Janson.
Married Carol Seyd, and had three children, Sarah, Lucinda and Jennifer.

References

1924 births
2000 deaths
British male sailors (sport)
Sailors at the 1956 Summer Olympics – Dragon
Sailors at the 1960 Summer Olympics – Dragon
Olympic sailors of Great Britain
Olympic bronze medallists for Great Britain
Olympic medalists in sailing
Medalists at the 1956 Summer Olympics